Alison Gaylin is an American author.

Awards 

Edgar Allan Poe Award for Best Paperback Original in 2019 for If I Die Tonight
Shamus Award for Best Original Paperback P.I. Novel in 2013 for And She Was
Finalist for Los Angeles Times Book Prize for Mystery/Thriller in 2021 for The Collective

References 

Edgar Award winners
Shamus Award winners
Living people
Year of birth missing (living people)